Arriba las mujeres is a 1943 Mexican film. It was directed by and starring Carlos Orellana. Also starring in the film are Consuelo Guerrero de Luna, Antonio Badú and Pedro Infante. Although Infante appeared in several films, this is the only film that he did not sing.

Plot 
A strong woman, Felicidad (Gerrero de Luna) unites with her daughters to form a women's union in order to rebel against the men, which includes her own husband, Chuy (Infante) who in turn unites with other husbands as a result.

Cast list 
 Consuelo Guerrero de Luna as Felicidad
 Carlos Orellana as Laureano
 Antonio Badú as Zaid Bazur
 Amparo Morillo as Luz Tenue
 Pedro Infante as Chuy
 Margarita Cortés
 Víctor Urruchúa as Enrique
 Virginia Zurí as Amalia
 Manuel Noriega Ruiz as Don Próspero (as Manolo Noriega)
 Arturo Soto Rangel as Juez Leobardo (as A. Soto Rangel)
 Carolina Barret as Tacha
 María Luisa Orellana

References

External links 
 
 
Credit

1943 films
1940s Spanish-language films
Mexican black-and-white films
Mexican comedy-drama films
1943 comedy-drama films
1940s Mexican films